Jeff Yorga (born October 31, 1981 in Moose Jaw, Saskatchewan) was a Canadian Football League offensive lineman for the Toronto Argonauts. He was signed as a free agent by the Argonauts on February 21, 2006.  Prior to joining the Argonauts, Yorga played for the University of Regina Rams and the Regina Thunder.

References

1981 births
Living people
Regina Rams players
Sportspeople from Moose Jaw
Toronto Argonauts players